Abel Jorge Pereira da Silva, CvIH (born 21 August 1969), sometimes known as just Abel, is a Portuguese former footballer.

One of the players who scored (both editions combined) goals in Portugal's two consecutive U-20 World Cup triumphs, the right back played for a total of ten clubs.

He started his career with Benfica, where he later worked as an assistant coach and a scout after amassing Primeira Liga totals of 142 matches and two goals over the course of nine seasons.

Playing career
In 1987, at the age of 18, Lisbon-born Abel was invited to play for S.L. Benfica's youth sides, where he performed well winning many awards, moving to the first team after just one season. He was on squad for Portugal when it won the 1989 FIFA World Youth Championship, scoring the opener in the final against Nigeria (2–0).

After an unspectacular first year, only playing one game (his debut came against S.C. Braga, on 2 April 1989, in a 1–0 win), Silva transferred to Académica de Coimbra from the second division on loan, where he was given his first real chance as a senior. His next stop was at F.C. Penafiel, also on loan, where he started most of the year to help them avoid top level relegation, ultimately netting his penultimate goal as a professional.

Abel experienced a final loan spell with C.S. Marítimo also in the Primeira Liga, in the 1991–92 campaign, then returned to Benfica. In January 1995 he was finally released and joined Vitória FC, where he remained until the end of the season.

Subsequently, Silva represented F.C. Felgueiras, S.C. Campomaiorense, G.D. Estoril Praia, F.C. Alverca and Atlético Clube de Portugal – the latter in division three – with an average of about 20 appearances per year, before retiring from the game in June 2001 at nearly 32.

Coaching career
In the 2004–05 season, Abel took up coaching, being part of Giovanni Trappatoni's staff as Benfica put an end to an 11-year drought and won the national league. After more assistant spells, with F.C. Famalicão and Al-Nassr FC, he began his head coaching career in 2007, with lowly C.D. Portosantense.

On two separate spells, Abel worked with Benfica as scout.

References

External links

Benfica career stats 

1969 births
Living people
Footballers from Lisbon
Portuguese footballers
Association football defenders
Primeira Liga players
Liga Portugal 2 players
Segunda Divisão players
Atlético Clube de Portugal players
S.L. Benfica footballers
Associação Académica de Coimbra – O.A.F. players
F.C. Penafiel players
C.S. Marítimo players
Vitória F.C. players
F.C. Felgueiras players
S.C. Campomaiorense players
G.D. Estoril Praia players
F.C. Alverca players
Portugal youth international footballers
Portugal under-21 international footballers
Portuguese football managers